Ole Bjarne Kassow (born 25 September 1935) is a Danish rower. He competed in the men's coxless four event at the 1960 Summer Olympics. In 1966, he received the badge of honor from the Københavns Roklub (Copenhagen Rowing Club).

References

External links
 

1935 births
Living people
Danish male rowers
Olympic rowers of Denmark
Rowers at the 1960 Summer Olympics
People from Helsingør
Sportspeople from the Capital Region of Denmark